The Alcoholic Beverage Control Division is an Arkansas state government agency. The duties of the Alcoholic Beverage Control - Administration Division are to receive applications for and issue, refuse to issue, suspend or revoke permits to manufacture, wholesale, retail and transport alcoholic beverages in Arkansas.

They also promulgate and adopt rules and regulations necessary to comply with alcoholic beverage control laws of the State, and in addition, conduct hearings for the purpose of cancellation, suspension or revocation of any and all alcoholic beverage permits.

State alcohol agencies of the United States
Government of Arkansas